Bembidion concolor is a species of ground beetle in the family Carabidae.

References

concolor
Articles created by Qbugbot
Beetles described in 1837